Baggio Wallenburg (born 30 March 1999) is a Dutch football player. He plays for DHSC.

Club career
He made his Eerste Divisie debut for Jong PSV on 23 March 2018 in a game against Jong FC Utrecht as an 80th-minute substitute for Kenneth Paal.

References

External links
 

1999 births
People from Houten
Living people
Dutch footballers
Netherlands youth international footballers
Association football defenders
Jong PSV players
DHSC players
Eerste Divisie players
Footballers from Utrecht (province)